Qandala (also known as Candala, Andala, Bender Chor, Bandar Kor, Bender Kor or Taba Tege) is an ancient port town in the northeastern Bari province of Somalia.

Overview

Qandala sits on a wadi estuary, which forms a natural protective harbor for vessels on the Gulf of Aden. It lies 75 kilometres (47 mi) east of Bosaso, 549 kilometres (341 mi) south of Aden, and 475 kilometres (295 mi) west of Socotra.

The city is located in the autonomous Puntland region of Somalia. It is the capital of the Qandala District.

In antiquity, Qandala was an active trading center for merchants from the interior of the Horn of Africa, who transported goods such as incense, gum and aromatic woods to and from the port. Its nickname Gacanka Hodonka ("Gulf of Prosperity") is a relic from this era.

Additionally, Qandala is coextensive with the ancient town of Botiala. The latter settlement features an old fortress complex, which overlooks and controls the mouth of the wadi leading inland.

2016 ISIL capture

On 26 October 2016, a militant group linked to ISIL captured Qandala with 50 armed fighters after brief firefight with local security forces, thus becoming the first town to be seized by Islamic State affiliated militants in Somalia. BBC News reported that ISIL militants had withdrawn from the town for unclear reasons. However, the report was denied by other media outlets and claimed that it is false. On 7 December 2016, a Somali official says Puntland security forces have recaptured the port from ISIL-linked fighters, killing 30 militants. Another four soldiers were also killed during the operation.

Demographics
Qandala has a population of around 19,300 inhabitants.

Education
Qandala has a number of academic institutions. According to the Puntland Ministry of Education, there are 15 primary schools in the Qandala District. Among these are Xamure, Dhadar, Turmasale and Gurur.

Transportation
Qandala has a small seaport.

Air transportation in the city is served by the Candala Airport.

See also
Damo
Essina
Heis
Mosylon
Opone
Sarapion

References

External links
Candala, Somalia

Populated places in Bari, Somalia
Maritime history of Somalia
Port cities in Africa
Gulf of Aden